Sla Kaet is a commune (sangkat) of Battambang Municipality in Battambang Province in north-western Cambodia.

Villages
Sla Kaet contains three villages.

References

Communes of Battambang province
Battambang District